The 1986 National Panasonic Cup was the 13th edition of the NSWRL Midweek Cup, a NSWRL-organised national club Rugby League tournament between the leading clubs and representative teams from the NSWRL, the BRL, the CRL, Western Australia and Papua New Guinea.

A total of 17 teams from across Australia and Papua New Guinea played 16 matches in a straight knock-out format, with the matches being held midweek during the premiership season.

Qualified Teams

Venues

Preliminary round

Round 1

Quarter finals

Semi finals

Final

Player of the Series
 Ray Price (Parramatta)

Golden Try
 Gary Bridge (Balmain)

Sources

 https://web.archive.org/web/20070929103317/http://users.hunterlink.net.au/~maajjs/aus/nsw/sum/nsw1986.htm

1986
1986 in Australian rugby league